Quiso  may refer to:
 A fictionary island in the novel Shardik
 A Quasi-isomorphism in mathematics